Joseph Vermilion was a 27-year old- white Man  lynched December 3, 1889 for the crime of arson in Upper Marlboro, Maryland.

Joe Vermillion had been jailed in Upper Marlboro for a series of arsons involving barns filled with tobacco and houses in Prince George's County.  At 2:30am, a band of masked men broke into the jail, overpowered the jailkeeper and left with Vermillion.

Vermillion was dragged to the "iron bridge just between the town and the railroad depot" and hanged. His body was left hanging from the bridge for the coroner's investigation.

That same bridge was used 5 years later in another lynching of Stephen Williams by a similar band of masked men.

External links
Resources relating to Joe Vermillion at the Maryland State Archives

References

1889 murders in the United States
Lynching deaths in Maryland
1889 deaths
1889 in Maryland
Prince George's County, Maryland
December 1889 events